Sukanya Chor Charoenying  (born 24 November 1987) is a Thai women's international footballer who plays as a goalkeeper. She is a member of the Thailand women's national football team. She was part of the team at the 2015 FIFA Women's World Cup. On club level she plays for Air Force United in Thailand.

References

1987 births
Living people
Sukanya Chor Charoenying
Sukanya Chor Charoenying
Footballers at the 2018 Asian Games
2015 FIFA Women's World Cup players
Sukanya Chor Charoenying
Women's association football goalkeepers
2019 FIFA Women's World Cup players
Sukanya Chor Charoenying